Thomas Blinkhorn (23 April 1903 – 15 June 1976) was an English professional rugby league footballer who played in the 1920s and 1930s.

Background
Blinkhorn was born in Wigan, Lancashire, and he died aged 73 in Wigan, Greater Manchester, England.

Playing career
He started playing rugby league for Wigan Highfield before moving to Warrington. Blinkhorn played and scored a try in Warrington's 15-2 victory over Salford in the 1929 Lancashire Cup Final at Central Park, Wigan on Saturday 23 November 1929. Blinkhorn played in Warrington's 17-21 defeat by Huddersfield in the 1933 Challenge Cup Final during the 1932–33 season at Wembley Stadium, London on Saturday 6 May 1933, in front of a crowd of 41,784. he made his début for Broughton Rangers as a  against Hull Kingston Rovers at Belle Vue Stadium, Belle Vue, Manchester.

References

External links
Statistics at wolvesplayers.thisiswarrington.co.uk
Rangers' New Back - Blinkhorn From Warrington

1903 births
1976 deaths
Broughton Rangers players
England national rugby league team players
English rugby league players
Great Britain national rugby league team players
Liverpool City (rugby league) players
Rugby league fullbacks
Rugby league players from Wigan
Rugby league wingers
Warrington Wolves players